Evolution Festival was a music festival held annually across Newcastle upon Tyne and Gateshead, England, from 2002 until 2013. The festival attracted tens of thousands of attendees every year and usually took place on the Quayside. Evolution Festival was briefly titled Orange Evolution due to a sponsorship deal with the mobile phone company Orange. It has been described as "the biggest festival Tyneside has ever staged".

Headline performers at Evolution Festival included Dizzee Rascal, The Wombats, Paolo Nutini and Maxïmo Park. Florence + The Machine, Amy Winehouse and Ellie Goulding all appeared at Evolution before the height of their fame.

In 2014 Evolution Festival did not take place, and although the organisers claimed it was only a "pause" the event has not been held since. A smaller event featuring local bands, Evolution Emerging, was held up until 2019, when it rebranded into Tipping Point live.

History 
Evolution Festival started in 2002. In 2003 the event took place on the Quayside for the first time, with performances from Moloko, Biffy Clyro and Inspiral Carpets. In 2004, due to funding restrictions, Evolution returned to its multi-venue format including a Shindig event headlined by Eric Morillo and Deep Dish. Evolution returned to the Quayside in 2005, sponsored by the mobile phone network Orange and featuring a three-stage event headlined by Dizzee Rascal and The Futureheads. Major Tyneside export Maxïmo Park headlined the 2007 event. In 2008, the festival ended its sponsorship with Orange and became known as Evolution Festival, and introduced an entry charge - of £3 - for the first time.

In 2009 the festival became a two-day event with performances from The Wombats, White Lies and Florence + The Machine. A folk stage was added in 2010. In 2012 the organisers of Evolution held a one-off edition of the festival at Avenham Park, Preston as part of the Preston Guild celebrations. The one-day event, titled GFest, featured performances from Maverick Sabre, Labrinth and Stooshe and attracted thousands of festival-goers. The 2013 edition of the main Newcastle event featured The Vaccines, Ellie Goulding, Paloma Faith and Jake Bugg.

In 2014 Evolution Festival did not take place, although promoters Jim Mawdsley and Dave Stone said that it was not the end of Evolution Festival. The festival has, however, not been held since 2013 and no news of a relaunch has been announced. The Evolution brand continues through Evolution Emerging, a multiple venue event that showcases new bands from the local region.

Line-ups

Orange Evolution 05

Orange Evolution 06

Orange Evolution 07

Evolution Festival 08

Evolution Festival 09

Evolution Festival 2010

Evolution Festival 2011

Note: Clare Maguire replaced Fenech Soler who were playing the Baltic Stage due to illness within the band.
Note: Toyger replaced Clare Maguire who was playing the Baltic Stage due to a last minute cancellation.

Evolution Festival 2012

Evolution Festival 2013

References

External links 

Evolution Festival on Chronicle Live

Rock festivals in England
Culture in Newcastle upon Tyne
Music festivals in Tyne and Wear
Music festivals established in 2002